Joseph P. Cryan (born September 1, 1961 in East Orange, New Jersey) is an American Democratic Party politician who has served in the New Jersey Senate since 2018, representing the 20th Legislative District. He previously served in the New Jersey General Assembly from 2002 to 2015, where he also represented the 20th Legislative District.

New Jersey Assembly 
Cryan was the Majority Leader of the New Jersey General Assembly, serving from January 12, 2010, until January 10, 2012. Cryan served as the Assembly's Deputy Majority Leader 2006–2010, and was Assistant Majority Leader from 2004 to 2005. He served on the Human Services Committee and the Law and Public Safety Committee.

New Jersey Senate

2017 election
Cryan ran for New Jersey Senate in 2017, and won. Cryan was sworn in on January 9, 2018.

2021 election

Assemblymember Jamel Holley announced in January 2021, that he would challenge Cryan in the June 2021 primaries. Jason Krychiw is also running against Cryan in the primary.

Tenure

Committees 
Commerce
Law and Public Safety

District 20
Each of the 40 districts in the New Jersey Legislature has one representative in the New Jersey Senate and two members in the New Jersey General Assembly. The other representatives from the 20th District for the 2022—23 Legislative Session are:
Assemblyman Reginald Atkins (D)
Assemblywoman Annette Quijano (D)

Personal
Cryan was born on September 1, 1961, in East Orange and raised Roman Catholic. His father, John F. Cryan, an immigrant from County Roscommon, Ireland, was elected to the General Assembly and served as Sheriff of Essex County.

Cryan's father had been charged in Federal court with racketeering and corruption, though the judge in the case dismissed the charges due to prosecutorial mistakes and ended the proceedings against him.

The lawmaker's son, also named John Cryan, was convicted of brutally beating a motorist with a baseball bat while two accomplices punched and kicked the victim, after a case of road rage that occurred when his father was in the General Assembly. The younger Cryan was ordered by the court only to probation but he was later jailed for violating the terms of his sentence.

Other relatives involved in public life are his cousin, Morristown Councilman John Cryan, his sister, Union Township Municipal Clerk Eileen Birch, his cousin, Cranford, New Jersey township administrator Jamie Cryan, his brother-in-law Superior Court judge Joseph Donohue.

The New York Post reported that Cryan "graphically spelled out his kinky proclivities in more than 150 e-mails that he sent to" a former lobbyist for Prudential Financial who pleaded guilty to stalking his girlfriend in exchange for being allowed to participate in a pre-trial intervention program. "The e-mails were written when the pol presumably would have been at one of his government jobs — either his $49,000-a-year Assembly gig or his $111,000-a-year post as Union County undersheriff," the Post said.
 
Cryan graduated with a B.A. from Belmont Abbey College in Business Administration in 1983. Cryan was born in East Orange, and currently resides in Union Township.

Democratic state chairman 
Cryan has served on the New Jersey State Democratic Committee since 2002, as Vice Chair. On February 17, 2006, Cryan was selected to be the head of the New Jersey Democratic State Committee, succeeding Bonnie Watson Coleman. He stepped down after the selection of his successor John S. Wisniewski on January 27, 2010.
As Democratic state chairman, in November 2009, Assemblyman Cryan presided over a Democratic gubernatorial party loss by incumbent Jon Corzine to Republican Chris Christie.  He was replaced as state chairman in January 2010 by Assemblyman John Wisniewski.

Electoral history

New Jersey Senate

New Jersey Assembly

References

External links
Assemblyman Joseph Cryan Official Webpage at the New Jersey Legislature
New Jersey Legislature financial disclosure forms
2010 2009 2008 2007 2006 2005 2004
New Jersey Voter Information Website 2003

1961 births
American people of Irish descent
Belmont Abbey College alumni
Chairmen of the New Jersey Democratic State Committee
Living people
Democratic Party members of the New Jersey General Assembly
Democratic Party New Jersey state senators
Politicians from East Orange, New Jersey
People from Union Township, Union County, New Jersey
21st-century American politicians